The first Silesian Chess Congress was held in 1922. On 19 September 1877 the Breslau Chess Association (Breslauer Schachverein) was founded by Theodor von Scheve. In 1895 Görlitz and 1899 Liegnitz were meetings of mainly Silesian clubs.

After the World War I Germany had to cede a part of the Ostprovinzen, mainly Posen (Poznań). In 1922 the new Silesian Chess Federation (Schlesischer Schachverband) was founded and held congresses until 1939.  Members of this federation (Oberschlesischer Schachverband, Groß-Breslauer Schachverband) and of the German Chess Federation in Czechoslovakia (Deutscher Schachverband in der Tschechoslowakei) played in each other's championships.

When the Nazis came to power in 1933, Heinz Josef Foerder, being a Jew, lost his job, and moved to Riga, Latvia. In 1934 he emigrated to British Mandate of Palestine where he had changed his name to Yosef Porat. In April 1935, he tied for 3rd-5th in Tel Aviv (the 2nd Maccabiah Games, Abram Blass won).

Winners

{| class="sortable wikitable"
! # !! Year !! City !! Winner !! Comment
|-
| 1 ||  1922 || Neisse || Hermann Thelen || Thelen won ahead of Kramer
|-
| 2 ||1923 ||  Beuthen  || Adolf Kramer || Kramer won a play-off against Ertelt
|-
| 3 ||1924 ||  Bad Salzbrunn   || Walter Bergmann || Bergmann won a play-off against Kramer
|-
| 4 ||1925 ||  Breslau   || Otto Rüster || played alongside the 24th DSB Congress
|-
| 5 ||1926 ||  Bad Altheide  || Gottlieb Machate || Friedrich Sämisch (off contest) won
|-
| 6 ||1927 ||  Gleiwitz  || Ludwig Schmitt || Schmitt got extra-points more than Foerder
|-
| 7 ||1928 ||  Reichenbach  || Gottlieb Machate ||
|-
| 8  ||1929  || Bad Warmbrunn || Walter Bergmann || Bergmann from Glogau
|-
| 9 ||1930 ||  Breslau  || Heinz Foerder || Foerder won ahead of Rudolf Pitschak
|-
| 10  ||1931  || Bad Salzbrunn || Heinz Foerder, Gottlieb Machate ||
|-
| 11  ||  1932  || Ratibor || Heinz Foerder ||
|-
| 12 ||1933 ||  Bad Salzbrunn  || Ludwig Schmitt || Schmitt won ahead of Carl Ahues
|-
|  13  ||1934  || Ottmachau || Ludwig Schmitt ||
|-
| 14  ||1937 || Beuthen   || Gottlieb Machate ||
|-   
| 15 || 1938 ||Liegnitz ||  Dietrich Duhm || Prof. Duhm from Breslau
|-
| 16 ||1939 ||  Bad Warmbrunn  || Erich Weinitschke || Weinitschke won a play-off against Heuaecker
|}

References 

Chess competitions
Chess in Germany
Sports organizations established in 1922
Recurring sporting events established in 1922
Recurring events disestablished in 1939
Organizations disestablished in 1939